Chiojdeni is a commune located in Vrancea County, Romania. It is composed of eight villages: Cătăuți, Chiojdeni, Lojnița, Luncile, Mărăcini, Podurile, Seciu, and Tulburea.

References

Communes in Vrancea County
Localities in Muntenia